The Society of Independent Brewers (formerly the Small Independent Brewers Association, or SIBA) is an organization representing the interests of independent breweries in the UK. Founded in 1980, it was intended to fight the pub-tie system, under which large brewers owned 80% of the UK's pubs. It changed its name in 1995 to reflect the changing aspirations of its members, but retained its original acronym.

History
Peter Austin was the prime mover in establishing SIBA, and was the group's first chairman. Under his leadership, SIBA campaigned for 21 years for a progressive beer duty system, where smaller breweries would pay less tax on their products, to be introduced in the UK. Such a system was eventually adopted by then-Chancellor Gordon Brown.

Current status
With growing credibility and campaigning success, SIBA has come to represent the broad spectrum of the UK independent brewing sector. There is no longer a ceiling on membership and SIBA.

In 2010, The Guardian reported that SIBA members had seen sales rise by 4% in 2009, and smaller members, who brew fewer than 350 barrels per week who constitute the vast majority of SIBA's membership, saw volume sales rise by 8.5%. SIBA is  chaired by Roy Allkin, the owner of Boss Brewing Company.

Activities
SIBA aims to ensure that its members' products are of high quality, and membership is conditional upon adhering to the Code of Practice and By-Laws.

SIBA has previously attended the Great British Beer Festival (GBBF) with a bar showcasing the winners of that year's SIBA National Beer Competition.

In December 2003, SIBA launched the Direct Delivery Scheme (DDS) to help small brewers promote, sell and distribute their beers to local pubs, pubcos and retailers. The Internet-based system facilitates trade between "micro-suppliers and macro-consumers."

See also 

 Beer in the United Kingdom
 List of microbreweries

References

External links 
 

Beer in the United Kingdom
Beer organizations
Hospitality industry in the United Kingdom
1980 establishments in the United Kingdom
Organisations based in North Yorkshire
Ripon